Naili is a village in the Gaya district of Bihar state, India.

References

Villages in Gaya district